The 2021 Gloucester City Council election took place on 6 May 2021 to elect members of Gloucester City Council in England. This was on the same day as other local elections. There were held elections for all 39 of the City Council’s seats, Quedgeley Town Council and for the Police and Crime Commissioner for Gloucestershire, all of which were postponed from May 2020 due to the COVID-19 pandemic.

Summary

Election result

|-

Ward Results

Abbeydale

Abbeymead

 
Isabel Brazil was a sitting councillor in Kingsholm & Wotton ward.

Barnwood

Barton and Tredworth

Coney Hill

Elmbridge

Grange

Hucclecote

Kingsholm and Wotton

Kingsway

Longlevens

Matson and Robinswood

Moreland

Podsmead

Quedgeley Fieldcourt

 
Hannah Norman was a sitting councillor in Quedgeley Severn Vale ward.

Quedgeley Severn Vale

Tuffley

Westgate

By-Elections

Longlevens
A by-election was held in Longlevens ward on 4 November 2021 following the resignation of Clive Walford.

Tuffley
A by-election was held in Tuffley ward on 13 October 2022 following the death of Colin Organ.

References

Gloucester
2021
2020s in Gloucestershire